Centropyxiella is a genus of Amoebozoa in the family Centropyxidae.

References

External links 

 

Amoebozoa genera
Tubulinea